Capital of Ladakh may refer to:
 Kargil
 Leh